Nero's Torches is an 1876 painting by the Polish artist Henryk Siemiradzki. It is also known as Candlesticks of Christianity (Świeczniki chrześcijaństwa).

Description
It depicts a group of Early Christian martyrs who are about to be burned alive as the alleged perpetrators of the Great Fire of Rome, during the reign of emperor Nero in 64 AD. People from many different social spheres, including the emperor himself, are present to watch the burning, which takes place in front of the Domus Aurea. The motif is based on the descriptions by Suetonius and Tacitus. Of note is that the signs attached to the feet of the condemned list their alleged crimes, and show the Alexamenos Graffito.

Reception
The painting was first exhibited in 1876 at the Accademia di San Luca in Rome. It went on to tour Europe with stops in Vienna, Munich, Prague, Lviv, Berlin, Saint Petersburg, Poznań, Paris and London. It was met with critical acclaim by masters of academic art such as Hans Makart and Lawrence Alma-Tadema. It has been the target of criticism over Siemiradzki's handling of exterior human beauty by painter and controversial art theoretician Stanisław Witkiewicz opposed to historical realism in general, and the monumental art of Jan Matejko in particular.

Siemiradzki donated Nero's Torches to the recently initiated National Museum in Kraków in 1879 during Józef Ignacy Kraszewski’s anniversary celebrations. With his grant, Siemiradzki inaugurated the national collection. The painting is on display at the Siemiradzki Room of the Sukiennice Museum Gallery of 19th-Century Polish Art, housed at the Renaissance Sukiennice Hall in Main Square, Kraków (listed as UNESCO World Heritage Site since 1978).

References

1876 paintings
Cultural depictions of Nero
Paintings by Henryk Siemiradzki
Paintings in the collection of the National Museum, Kraków
Paintings based on works by Tacitus
Works based on the Annals (Tacitus)